The 2022–23 Detroit Mercy Titans men's basketball team represented the University of Detroit Mercy in the 2022–23 NCAA Division I men's basketball season. The Titans, led by fifth-year head coach Mike Davis, played their home games at Calihan Hall in Detroit, Michigan, as members of the Horizon League.

Titans guard Antoine Davis moved into second place on the all-time Division I men's scoring list behind LSU great Pete Maravich, passing Portland State's Freeman Williams on January 21, 2023.  Davis finished his college career with 3,664 points, which fell three points shy of Maravich's record of 3,667.

Previous season
The Titans finished the 2021–22 season 14–15, 10–7 in Horizon League play to finish in sixth place. They defeated Green Bay in the first round of the Horizon League tournament, before falling to Northern Kentucky in the quarterfinals. They were invited to The Basketball Classic, where they lost to Florida Gulf Coast in the first round.

Roster

Schedule and results

|-
!colspan=12 style=""| Regular season

|-
!colspan=9 style=| Horizon League tournament

|-

Sources

References

Detroit Mercy Titans men's basketball seasons
Detroit Mercy Titans
Detroit Mercy Titans men's basketball
Detroit Mercy Titans men's basketball